Gauntlet track or interlaced track (also gantlet track) is an arrangement in which railway tracks run parallel on a single track bed and are interlaced (i.e., overlapped) in such a way that only one pair of rails can be used at any time. Since this requires only slightly more width than a single track, all rails can be carried on the same crossties/sleepers. Trains run on the discrete pair of rails appropriate to their direction, track gauge or loading gauge.

The term gauntlet refers to the expression running the gauntlet, which means running between two confining rows of adversaries.

Configurations

Frog gauntlet (double-gauntlet-double) 
Gauntlet tracks can be used to provide horizontal clearance to a fixed obstruction adjacent to a track such as a cutting, bridge, or tunnel. Frog gauntlets are also commonly used when a rail line's capacity is increased by the provision of an additional track, but cost or other factors prevent the widening of the bridges. They are typically used for short stretches of track where it is cheaper to provide extra rails than to provide switches and reduce the line to single track. This also eliminates the problem of switch/point failures.

In a frog gauntlet, one rail crosses over a rail on the adjacent track. A frog is used to provide the flangeway for the crossing tracks. The train taking the gauntlet runs over the frog onto the parallel rails, passes through the gauntlet area, and passes over another frog to return to the original line. Since there are no points or other moving parts on a frog gauntlet track, a train operating on one of the tracks cannot be routed onto the other.  
Because two trains cannot use the gauntlet at the same time, scheduling and signalling must allow for this restriction.
.

Point gauntlet/interlaced loop (single-gauntlet-single) 

In a point gauntlet track, the rails for the two tracks do not need to cross, so no frog is required. The train taking the gauntlet runs over a set of switch points onto the parallel rails, passes through the gauntlet area, and passes over another set of switch points to return to the original line. This arrangement is used at the Roselle Park Station referenced below.

At a small number of locations on single track lines in Britain, interlaced loops had been provided where sprung catch points were required because of the steep gradient. The points at either end of the loop were set according to the train's direction of travel. Trains running uphill were routed via the loop incorporating the sprung catch point. Trains running downhill used the opposite loop, bypassing the catch point.

Single-gauntlet-double 
Where tracks diverge, but it is not practical to locate the physical switch apparatus at the point of divergence (especially on trams, where roads may be in the way), a section of gauntlet track may be provided between where the tracks actually diverge and the location of the physical switch.

Dual-gauge track 

An arrangement similar to gauntlet track is sometimes used to allow trains of different gauges to use the same track. In that case, the two interlaced tracks will have different gauges, sometimes sharing one of the rails for a total of three rails when the difference between the track gauges is large enough.

Examples

Australia
In Melbourne, broad (1600 mm) and standard dual gauge gauntlet track is located within the passenger yard of Southern Cross station, and in platforms 1 and 2. Those tracks also run on the Regional Rail Link flyover towards South Dynon yards. The northern section of the Upfield line, between the Ford sidings and Somerton, is also dual gauge gauntlet track. On the Western standard gauge line from Melbourne towards Adelaide, dual gauge track can be found between the Geelong Harbour and Gheringhap, as well as along the Newport-Sunshine freight line in Melbourne.

Belgium/Germany

The double-track tunnel has a third set of rails interlaced with one of the normal tracks. Active points (switches) at each end of the tunnel allow a train to divert along the central track, whilst other trains are blocked by signalling. The third track is rarely in use, so there is no limitation of capacity through the tunnel for standard-sized trains.

Close to where the borders of Belgium, Germany and the Netherlands come together, the interlaced tunnel section provides an important connection between Germany and the Belgian harbour at Antwerp. After completing the installation in 1991, trains with an oversize loading gauge were rerouted over this line, and the lightly used (but tunnel-free) secondary line between Stolberg and Welkenraedt (crossing the border at Raeren) was closed to freight traffic. Electric-hauled trains requiring use of the central track will get their power from the right track's (in travelling direction Germany to Belgium) overhead rail, which to that purpose is slightly further off-centre than normal.

Canada

Gauntlet track exists on the Perry Island Canadian Pacific Railway Bridge across the Rivière des Prairies between Montreal and Laval (Parc subdivision, mile 10.0) because the structure gauge is not sufficiently wide for double track.

The Toronto Streetcar System includes a very short section of gauntlet track on Queen Street East, at Coxwell Avenue. A loop allowing southbound cars to return northbound on Coxwell Avenue briefly interlaces with the westbound track on Queen Street, due to turning radius limitations. A switch partially within the gauntlet section allows westbound streetcars from Queen Street to transition to the loop curve, and turn right onto Coxwell Avenue, but streetcars already within the loop cannot switch to the westbound Queen Street track.

Finland

At the border with Sweden where the Torne river separates the cities of Tornio, Finland and Haparanda, Sweden, a two-kilometre section of dual gauge track uses a gauntlet configuration because the  gauge used in Finland and  used in Sweden are too close for a common rail to be shared. The link, which opened in 1919 with the completion of the Torne River Railway Bridge, is complemented by a marshalling yard at each end, an arrangement that allows trains from either country to stop in the other for freight to be transferred to trains of the local gauge.

Russia
The Moscow tramway network has only one stretch of gauntlet track remaining in place. The five-track railway line just south of Kursky Terminal is crossed through a narrow tunnel built at the beginning of the 20th century and unsuitable for a two-track tram line. Other similar stretches were removed or re-organised, since according to the standards, gauntlet tracks on tram lines are only permitted as a temporary measure.

United States
The San Francisco cable car system features three areas with gauntlet tracks where the outer rail of the inner track is shared as the inner rail of the outer track for two sections of tracks: on Washington Street between Mason Street and Powell Street, on Powell Street (north of Washington Street) onto Jackson Street to the point of divergence of the Powell Street lines at Jackson Street and Mason Street, and on Hyde Street between Jackson Street and Washington Street.

Although a monorail cannot strictly speaking have gauntlet track, the nearest equivalent would be when two parallel monorail tracks are too close together to allow two trains to pass.

See also 
 Funicular
 Rail terminology (US/UK differences highlighted)
 Railway platform
 Railway platform height

Notes

External links

Permanent way
Railway track layouts